The 2016 United States presidential election in Massachusetts was held on Tuesday, November 8, 2016, as part of the 2016 United States presidential election in which all 50 states plus the District of Columbia participated. Massachusetts voters chose electors to represent them in the Electoral College via a popular vote, pitting the Republican Party's nominee, businessman Donald Trump, and running mate Indiana Governor Mike Pence against Democratic Party nominee, former Secretary of State Hillary Clinton, and her running mate Virginia Senator Tim Kaine. Massachusetts has 11 electoral votes in the Electoral College.

In the general election, Clinton won Massachusetts with 60.98% of the vote, while Trump received 33.34%. This marked the fourth consecutive election in which the Democratic candidate won over 60% of the vote, and the seventh in a row in which they won in every single county in the state, thus making Massachusetts and Hawaii the only states in which Clinton won every single county. Massachusetts had been a Democratic-leaning state since 1928, and a Democratic stronghold since 1960, and has maintained extremely large Democratic margins since 1996. It also marked the fourth consecutive election in which both the Democratic and Republican vote shares in Massachusetts fell; since 2004, the combined vote shares of the two major parties in the Commonwealth has gradually declined from 98.72% to 94.32%. Trump became the first Republican since Dwight D. Eisenhower in 1956 to win the town of Ware.

Primary elections

Democratic primary

Republican primary

Green-Rainbow primary
The Massachusetts primary took place on March 1. 5 candidates appeared on the ballot, the results are as follows:

Any members of the party could apply to be delegates to be sent to the national convention, and had until March 10 (over a week after the primary) to apply. The number of voters that took part in the election slightly increased from the 1,554 that took part in the 2012 primary.

United Independent primary
Ballots were available for voters enrolled in this party, but there were no candidates for office.

General election

Clinton improved on Obama's 2012 performance by around 4%, due to a large swing to the Democrat in the metropolitan Boston area, while the New Bedford and Fall River areas and the western part of Massachusetts, particularly eastern Berkshire County, swung to Trump.

Predictions
The following are final 2016 predictions from various organizations for Massachusetts as of Election Day.

Polling

Hillary Clinton won every single pre-election poll by upper double digits. The final poll showed Clinton with 56% to Trump's 26%, and the average of the final 3 polls showed Hillary Clinton leading Trump 56% to 27%.

Results

Results by county

Results by Municipality

Results by congressional district
Clinton won all 9 congressional districts.

See also
 United States presidential elections in Massachusetts
 2016 Democratic Party presidential debates and forums
 2016 Democratic Party presidential primaries
 2016 Green Party presidential primaries
 2016 Republican Party presidential debates and forums
 2016 Republican Party presidential primaries

References

External links
 RNC 2016 Republican Nominating Process 
 Green papers for 2016 primaries, caucuses, and conventions
 Decision Desk Headquarter Results for Massachusetts

Mass
2016
Presidential